The Fairchild House on S. Main Street in Monticello, Kentucky is a Queen Anne-style house built in 1905-06 for Wilburn Fillmore Fairchild, a banker and prominent local merchant.  It was listed on the National Register of Historic Places in 2008.

It is a two-story brick house, in Queen Anne style with elements of Free Classic substyle, based on plans of Barber & Kluttz, architects of Knoxville, Tennessee who published pattern books that were distributed widely.

It has been operated as a bed and breakfast, as Fairchild's Bed & Breakfast.

References

Further reading
"Historic Context: Queen Anne Architecture in Monticello, Kentucky", PDF pages 10-20, included with NRHP registration in 

National Register of Historic Places in Wayne County, Kentucky
Queen Anne architecture in Kentucky
Houses completed in 1906
1906 establishments in Kentucky
Houses on the National Register of Historic Places in Kentucky
Bed and breakfasts in Kentucky
Monticello, Kentucky